Elvebakken Church is a parish church of the Church of Norway in Alta Municipality in Troms og Finnmark county, Norway. It is located in the Elvebakken area in the town of Alta. It is one of the churches for the Alta parish which is part of the Alta prosti (deanery) in the Diocese of Nord-Hålogaland. The white, wooden church was built in a long church style in 1964 using plans drawn up by the architect Håkon Soltveit. The church seats about 210 people.

History
The people of the Elvebakken area of Alta began pushing for their own local church in 1911. The had been advocating moving the Kåfjord Church to Elvebakken when the copper plant closed. After World War I, people raised money to build a church in Elvebakken, but the banking crisis led to the money collected being lost when the Hammerfest Sparekasse bank failed. Then again in 1937, work to raise money began again. The church was consecrated on 23 August 1964 by the local provost Englund.

See also
List of churches in Nord-Hålogaland

References

Alta, Norway
Churches in Finnmark
20th-century Church of Norway church buildings
Churches completed in 1964
1964 establishments in Norway
Long churches in Norway